Isaia Walker-Leawere (born 16 July 1997) is a New Zealand rugby union player who plays as a lock for the  in Super Rugby and  in New Zealand's domestic National Provincial Championship competition.

Early life and career

Walker-Leawere hails from Ruatoria, in the Gisborne Region in the northeastern corner of New Zealand's North Island. He's the son of Kele Leawere, who played as a lock for Fiji.

He attended and played First XV rugby for Gisborne Boys' High School. In 2014 and 2015, he played for the  U18 team.

Senior career

In 2016, Walker-Leawere moved to Wellington after being contracted by the Wellington Rugby Football Union. Before he had even played a single game of Mitre 10 Cup for the Lions, he was called into the  wider training squad for the final weeks of the 2016 Super Rugby season.

On 11 August 2016, Walker-Leawere was named in the  Lions squad. He made his Mitre 10 Cup debut against , nine days later. He went on to play three seasons for Wellington.

The Hawke's Bay Rugby Union announced on 7 June 2019 that Walker-Leawere had signed a three-year contract to play his provincial rugby for Hawke's Bay. He made his Magpies debut against  on 11 August 2019.

Meanwhile, in November 2017, the  announced that Walker-Leawere had signed a two-year deal with the franchise, and named him in their squad for the 2018 Super Rugby season. He missed the first part of the season as he was initially recovering from shoulder reconstruction surgery and then suffered a knee injury. He has since re-signed with the Hurricanes multiple time, most recently recommitting to the franchise until the end of the 2024 season.

International career

In 2014, Walker-Leawere was named in the New Zealand Barbarians Schools' team that played matches against Australian Schools and Fiji Schools. The following year, he was named in the New Zealand Secondary Schools team for a three-match international series in Australia. He started in all three games and scored two tries.

On 10 May 2016, Walker-Leawere was named in the New Zealand Under-20 squad for the 2016 World Rugby Under 20 Championship in England. He played all 5 games in a campaign that saw New Zealand finish at a disappointing 5th place.

In 2017, he enjoyed more success with the New Zealand Under 20 team. He played in two of the three games, and New Zealand retained the Oceania title.

On 8 May 2017, Walker-Leawere was named in the New Zealand Under-20 squad for the 2017 World Rugby Under 20 Championship in Georgia.  He played in all New Zealand's games and scored a try in the record 64-17 win over England in the final. New Zealand claimed its 6th World Rugby U20 Championship title that year.

In 2018, Walker-Leawere - who is of Ngāti Porou descent - was a member of the Māori All Blacks squad that toured the United States, Brazil and Chile. He made his Māori All Blacks debut on 3 November 2018 against the USA and scored two tries in that game. In July 2019, he was named in the squad again for a two-test series against Fiji. On 5 December 2020, he played for the Māori All Blacks in a one-off match against Moana Pasifika in Hamilton.

References

External links
itsrugby.co.uk profile

1997 births
Living people
Ngāti Porou people
New Zealand people of Fijian descent
New Zealand rugby union players
Rugby union players from the Gisborne Region
Rugby union locks
Poverty Bay rugby union players
Wellington rugby union players
Hurricanes (rugby union) players
Hawke's Bay rugby union players
Māori All Blacks players